N-Methyl-N-ethyltryptamine (MET) is a psychedelic tryptamine.  It is closely related to DMT and DET.

There is very little information on the human pharmacology or toxicity of MET.  The freebase is believed to be active via vaporization at 15 mg.

References

External links
Erowid's online version of TiHKAL, a book about Tryptamines

Entheogens
Psychedelic tryptamines
Designer drugs